The inner city is the central area of a major city.

Inner City may refer to:

Places
 Inner City (Baku), the ancient historical core of Baku, Azerbaijan
 Inner City (Budapest), the historical old town of Pest, now part of Budapest, Hungary
 Inner City, Johannesburg, South Africa

Other uses
 Inner City (band), an American electronic group of the 1980s
 Inner City Broadcasting Corporation, an American media company
 Inner City (film), a 1995 French film
 Inner City, working title for 2018 film Roman J. Israel, Esq.
 Inner City Press, a non-profit organization based in the South Bronx, New York
 Inner City Records, American jazz record label 
 Inner City (role-playing game), a 1982 role-playing game